Stuart Mitchell (21 December 1965 – August 2018) was a Scottish pianist and composer who was born in Edinburgh and who is best known for his Seven Wonders Suite (2001). The Seven Wonders Suite has been recorded by The Prague Symphony Orchestra conducted by Mario Klemens. A performance of part of the suite was performed in The Dvorak Hall in Prague in 2005. This major symphonic work has placed Mitchell in The Classic FM Hall of Fame since 2005, and is regularly requested by their listeners.

Stuart Mitchell was the son of pianist and composer Thomas J. Mitchell. In 2005, the Mitchells received media coverage from Reuters, ITN, BBC, and CNN/Fox News when they claimed to have deciphered a musical code carved into the ceiling design of Rosslyn Chapel.

In 2008, Mitchell released the first in his series of works called DNA Variations, music translated from Ancestral DNA sequences of various species and Fly – Orchestral Suite in 2016 was based upon the mitochondrial DNA music of birds and winged beings.

The Seven Wonders Suite was awarded the number 181 for the most popular classical music work in the Classic FM Hall of Fame 2017. And in the 2022 chart the suite had gone up to 143, the highest it has been.

Mitchell died of lung cancer in August 2018, aged 52.

Works
Cello Sonata in A – 1995
The Design of a Tear – 1998
Seven Wonders Suite for Orchestra (2003)
The Rosslyn Motet (2005)
Songs of the Chartres Labyrinth (2005)
DNA Variations Volume's I, II and III (2004–2009)
Transit of Venus – 2010
The Celestial Song of the Stars – 2010
Fanfare to Tutankhamen – 2009
Piano Concerto No.1 – 2008
Beethoven's DNA Music – 2010
The Eve Project (2011)
The Musical Life of Plants (2011)
The Emerald Tablets – Orchestral Choral Suite – 2008
Symphony No1 in B Flat Major – 2012
The Human Genome Music Project (2012)
Grounded – Motion Picture Soundtrack (2013)
Elvis Presley – DNA Music Translation/Rolling Stone Magazine
String Quartet – E minor – 2013
Faith Eternal for Choir & Orchestral – 2013
Power of the Earth – Grounded 2 Motion Picture – 2013
Symphony in the Key of H - 2013
Homage to the Great Composers – 2012
The Musical Life of Plants – Aromamusic – 2012
The Silent Sky – with Neil Warden – 2015
Fly – Orchestral Suite (2016)

References

1965 births
2018 deaths
Scottish classical composers
British male classical composers
20th-century classical composers
21st-century classical composers
Deaths from lung cancer
Deaths from cancer in Scotland
20th-century British composers
20th-century British male musicians
21st-century British male musicians